Baygan (also Romanized as Baygoon, Bāyegān and Bāygān) is a village in Ahmadabad Rural District, in the Central District of Firuzabad County, Fars Province, Iran. At the 2006 census, its population was 2,679, in 601 families.

References 

Populated places in Firuzabad County